Tus Hoisdorf is a German association football club from the municipality of Hoisdorf, Schleswig-Holstein. The footballers are part of a sports club that includes departments for badminton, gymnastics, table tennis, volleyball, and fitness programs.



History
The little known club enjoyed its greatest success through the 1980s and 90s when it was part of third and fourth tier competition. Hoisdorf won its way into the Amateuroberliga Nord (III) in 1988 and spent a single season in the newly formed Regionalliga Nord (III) in 1994–95 before being relegated to the Oberliga Hamburg/Schleswig-Holstein (IV). During this period TuS twice appeared (1989–90) in the preliminary rounds of the DFB-Pokal (German Cup) tournament. After a second-place finish in the Oberliga in 1998, they took part in a failed promotion round playoff being beaten by BV Cloppenburg (2–1 win, 6–0 loss). Despite another second-place result in 2001, the team voluntarily withdrew from higher level regional play. The team competed in the Kreisklasse A (IX) after dropping down from Kreisliga Stormarn (VIII) in 2014 but won a league championship in 2015 and moved back up.

Honours
The club's honours:
 Schleswig-Holstein-Liga: 1988
 Schleswig-Holstein Cup: 1988, 1989

References

External links

Das deutsche Fußball-Archiv historical German domestic league tables 

Football clubs in Germany
Football clubs in Schleswig-Holstein
Association football clubs established in 1958
1958 establishments in West Germany